The 1989–90 Irish League Cup (known as the Roadferry Freight League Cup for sponsorship reasons) was the fourth edition of Northern Ireland's secondary football knock-out cup competition. It concluded on 19 December 1989 with the final.

Glentoran were the defending champions after defeating arch-rivals Linfield 2–1 in the previous final. This season they went out at the quarter-final stage with a defeat to Portadown. Glenavon were the eventual winners, becoming the fourth different winner of the competition in its first four seasons. They defeated Newry Town 3–1 in the final.

First round
Ballyclare Comrades and Omagh Town both received byes into the second round.

|}

Second round

|}

Quarter-finals

|}

Semi-finals

|}

Final

References

Lea
1989–90 domestic association football cups
1989–90